Brian Ward (born 28 February 1944) is an English former cricketer. He played for Essex between 1967 and 1972.

References

External links

1944 births
Living people
English cricketers
Essex cricketers
Sportspeople from Chelmsford